Management Development Institute of Singapore in Tashkent (MDIST) is one of the first international university branches opened in Uzbekistan. It was established to cover the high demand for professionals in various fields. Since its founding, it has trained more than 4,500 graduates.

History 
In January 2007, Uzbek President Islam Karimov was invited to Singapore by its President, S.R.Nathan, in order to discuss important international problems, and expand cooperation between two states. During his visit to Singapore, Karimov signed various documents which were aimed to deepen the two nations' cooperation in different spheres. One of the most important issues of the visit was discussion of education in Uzbekistan. The visit led to the establishment of Management Development Institute of Singapore in Tashkent on 5 September 2007, by Resolution of the President of the Republic of Uzbekistan, edict number PD-691.

MDIS Tashkent is currently serving students of Uzbekistan and other CIS countries.

Academic processes, subjects and textbooks are fully organized in accordance with the principles and standards of the Management Development Institute of Singapore, and by the educational standards of the Republic of Uzbekistan. MDIS Tashkent offers undergraduate and postgraduate programs, and they are recognized as documents of higher education in Uzbekistan, in Singapore, and in the rest of the world. Currently, there are more than 3,100 students at MDIS Tashkent, from different regions of Uzbekistan and many other countries of Central Asia, such as Afghanistan, Kyrgyzstan, Tajikistan and Kazakhstan. There are also some students from Ukraine and South Korea. MDIS Tashkent has opened dormitories and hostels for these students.

The main campus of the Management Development Institute of Singapore in Tashkent is supplied with classrooms, lecture halls, computer laboratories, a hospitality training center, tennis court, indoor swimming pool, volleyball court, football pitch, and gym. In all, the campus covers 5.2 hectares.

MDIS Tashkent has one of the biggest information resource centers among universities of Tashkent. Interested students can enter the information resource center at any time and use textbooks or read books which they are interested in. The center is fully supplied with computers and Internet access.

Founders 
The Management Development Institute of Singapore in Tashkent is a joint venture educational establishment which offers international recognized degrees. It is currently owned by two institutions, which are the Management Development Institute of Singapore and Uzbekistan Banking Association. They own the 51% and 49% of the institute respectively.

Partner universities 
The Management Development Institute of Singapore in Tashkent cooperates with three international universities – the University of Sunderland, Bangor University and Teesside University (United Kingdom). After finishing the Foundation Program, all MDIS Tashkent students are asked to choose one of the partner universities in order to accomplish their undergraduate and postgraduate studies.

Education structure 
Education Structure of the Management Development Institute of Singapore in Tashkent consists of three different programs, which are the Foundation Program, Undergraduate Program, and Postgraduate Program.

Foundation Program 
The Foundation Program is the first year of the studies and it is offered as a day program which could be completed in one year. The program consists of seven modules for two semesters. The first semester consists of three modules, and the second semester consists of four modules. 
The Foundation Program provides the students with structured program of studies which helps to improve their English language and communication skills. In addition, it gives a sound knowledge base in business studies, business concepts, encourages the development of a creative attitude, and motivates the participants to understand how the corporations and companies are managed.

Undergraduate Program 
The Undergraduate Program is given only to the students who have successfully graduated from the Foundation Program. It lasts three years, and is provided by two different partner universities. However, the list of programs remains the same each year.

Postgraduate Program 
The Postgraduate Program is provided under one qualification, which is Master of Business Administration (MBA). Therefore, the qualification is divided into five specializations, which are: Finance, Marketing, Hospitality Management, Supply Chain Management and Human Resource Management. The study duration for full-time students is 15 months, and consists of eight modules for MBA Finance, MBA Marketing, Supply Chain Management and Human Resource Management specializations. The MBA Hospitality Management specialization covers seven modules. To join the MBA programs, interested applicants must have finished an undergraduate program at any university.

Location 
The Management Development Institute of Singapore in Tashkent's main campus and hostels are located in Tashkent city, Uzbekistan, Chilanzar district, Bunyodkor Avenue, house 28, 100185.

Photo gallery

References

External links 

News about the Institute in Russian

Universities in Uzbekistan
Education in Tashkent
Buildings and structures in Tashkent